Tom Berenger (born Thomas Michael Moore; May 31, 1949) is an American actor. He was nominated for the Academy Award for Best Supporting Actor for his portrayal of the ruthless Staff Sergeant Bob Barnes in Platoon (1986). He is also known for playing Jake Taylor in the Major League films and Thomas Beckett in the Sniper films.  Other films he appeared in include Looking for Mr. Goodbar (1977), The Dogs of War (1980), The Big Chill (1983), Eddie and the Cruisers (1983), Betrayed (1988), The Field (1990), Gettysburg (1993), The Substitute (1996), One Man's Hero (1999), Training Day (2001), and Inception (2010).

Berenger won the Primetime Emmy Award for Outstanding Supporting Actor in a Miniseries or a Movie for his performance as Jim Vance in the 2012 miniseries Hatfields & McCoys.

Early life and education
Berenger was born as Thomas Michael Moore in Chicago, on May 31, 1949, to a Catholic family of Irish ancestry with his great-grandfather and grandmother settling in Chicago. He has a sister, Susan. His father was a printer for the Chicago Sun-Times and a traveling salesman.

Moore graduated in 1967 from Rich East High School in Park Forest, Illinois. He studied journalism at the University of Missouri in Columbia, Missouri, but decided to seek an acting career following his graduation in 1971 with a Bachelor of Arts degree.

Career

He worked in regional theatre and in 1972, he worked as a flight attendant with Eastern Airlines, based in San Juan, Puerto Rico. He transferred to New York in 1973.

Moore selected "Berenger" as his professional name after he was forced to change his surname professionally, as there was already a "Tom Moore" in the Actors' Equity Association.

Berenger worked in soap operas and had a starring role as lawyer Tim Siegel on One Life to Live. His feature film debut was the lead in Rush It (1976), an independent film. In 1977, he had a small role as the killer of the lead character (played by Diane Keaton) in Looking for Mr. Goodbar based on the murder of schoolteacher Roseann Quinn. In 1978, he had a starring role in In Praise of Older Women for Avco-Embassy Pictures. In 1979, he played Butch Cassidy in Butch and Sundance: The Early Days, a role he got in part because of his resemblance to Paul Newman, who played the character in Butch Cassidy and the Sundance Kid (1969).

Berenger starred in several significant films in the 1980s, including The Big Chill (1983), Eddie and the Cruisers (1983), Rustlers' Rhapsody (1985), Platoon (1986), Someone to Watch Over Me (1987), Shoot to Kill (1988), and Major League (1989). In 1986, he received an Academy Award nomination for his portrayal of the ruthless Staff Sergeant Barnes in Platoon (this performance won him a Golden Globe Award for "Best Supporting Actor"). A role for which he has become well known for is Thomas Beckett, the main character in the mid-1990s film Sniper (which would later be followed by six sequels, featuring Berenger in the starring role for four). Other notable films from that period in which he was featured include Born on the Fourth of July (1989), Shattered (1991), Sliver (1993), and Chasers (1994). When asked in a 1999 interview to name his favorite film out of those in which he had acted, Berenger said it was too difficult to choose but that the one he had watched most frequently was his 1993 film Gettysburg, where he played the role of General James Longstreet.

He established the Tom Berenger Acting Scholarship Fund in 1988 to award theatre students for excellence in performance.

In more recent years, Berenger has continued to have an active acting career in film and television, although often at a supporting level. One of his most notable television appearances was on Cheers in its last season as Rebecca Howe's blue collar-plumber love interest, for which he was nominated for an Emmy Award for "Outstanding Guest Actor in a Comedy Series". He also began a career as a producer in the 1990s. Berenger co-produced the 1997 miniseries Rough Riders, also starring as Theodore Roosevelt.

Berenger was also seen on the box art and promotional content for Novalogic's Delta Force: Black Hawk Down, as his roles in Sniper 2 and Sniper 3 were very similar to what was chosen for the game's artwork. He starred in the mini-series version of Stephen King's Nightmares & Dreamscapes, as a celebrated author who realizes the warped painting he recently purchased is alive with illustrations of impending doom for him in "The Road Virus Heads North". Berenger stars opposite Armand Assante and Busta Rhymes in the dramatic thriller Breaking Point, which had a limited release starting in December 2009.

Berenger appeared in the 2010 science fiction thriller Inception with Leonardo DiCaprio and Cillian Murphy, where he played a business executive who served as a mentor to and was an associate of the father of Murphy's character. It was his first major film role since Training Day in 2001. In 2012 he appeared in the TV miniseries Hatfields & McCoys as Jim Vance, uncle of protagonist Devil Anse Hatfield (played by Kevin Costner). On September 23, 2012 Berenger earned a Primetime Emmy Award for Outstanding Supporting Actor in a Miniseries or a Movie for the role.

Personal life
Berenger married four times and has six children. He has two children by his first wife, Barbara Wilson, to whom he was married from 1976 to 1984: Allison Moore (born 1977) and Patrick Moore (born 1979). He has three daughters by second wife Lisa Williams (to whom he was married from 1986 to 1997): Chelsea Moore (born 1986), Chloe Moore (born 1988) and Shiloh Moore (born 1993). He has a daughter named Scout Moore (born 1998) with Patricia Alvaran, to whom he was married from 1998–2011. He married Laura Moretti in Sedona, Arizona, in early September 2012.

Filmography

Film

Television

References

External links
 
 
 Tom Berenger Online

1949 births
Living people
Male actors from Chicago
American male film actors
American male soap opera actors
American male television actors
American people of Irish descent
People from Beaufort, South Carolina
People from Toluca Lake, Los Angeles
Best Supporting Actor Golden Globe (film) winners
University of Missouri alumni
Outstanding Performance by a Supporting Actor in a Miniseries or Movie Primetime Emmy Award winners
20th-century American male actors
21st-century American male actors